Kerrigan may refer to:

Kerrigan (surname)
Kerrigan Mahan (born 1955), American voice actor
Kerrigan, Missouri, U.S. ghost town

See also

karrigan (born 1990), Danish esports player
Karigan, village in Gevar Rural District, Sarduiyeh District, Jiroft County, Kerman Province, Iran